Phumi Thmei is the name of several villages in Cambodia:

Phumi Thmei, Kandal
Phumi Thmei, Kratie
Phumi Thmei, Siem Reap
Phumi Thmei, Prey Veng
Phumi Thmei, Kampong Thom